Psalm 120 is the 120th psalm of the Book of Psalms, beginning in the English of the King James Version: "In my distress I cried unto the LORD, and he heard me". In the slightly different numbering system used in the Greek Septuagint and Latin Vulgate translations of the Bible, this psalm is Psalm 119. In Latin, it is known as "Ad Dominum cum tribularer clamavi". It is one of 15 psalms categorized as Song of Ascents (Shir Hama'alot).

The psalm forms a regular part of Jewish, Catholic, Lutheran, Anglican and other Protestant liturgies. It has been set to music in several languages.

Text

King James Version 
 In my distress I cried unto the LORD, and he heard me.
 Deliver my soul, O LORD, from lying lips, and from a deceitful tongue.
 What shall be given unto thee? or what shall be done unto thee, thou false tongue?
 Sharp arrows of the mighty, with coals of juniper.
 Woe is me, that I sojourn in Mesech, that I dwell in the tents of Kedar!
 My soul hath long dwelt with him that hateth peace.
 I am for peace: but when I speak, they are for war.

Verse 5 
Woe is me, that I dwell in Meshech,That I dwell among the tents of Kedar!"Woe is me" is a typical expression of despair. Meshech and Kedar (or Qedar) were "typical enemies [of Israel], who forced their way into the kingdom of Judah and vexed the people of God".

 Uses 
 Judaism 
This psalm is recited following Mincha between Sukkot and Shabbat Hagadol.

 Catholic Church 
According to the Rule of St. Benedict set in 530, this psalm was sung or recited during the third office during the week, namely from Tuesday until Saturday, followed by Psalm 121 (120) and Psalm 122 (121) and after the offices of the Sunday and Monday were occupied with Psalm 119, which is the longest among the 150 psalms.

In the Liturgy of the Hours, Psalm 120 is now recited in Vespers on the Monday of the fourth week of the four weekly liturgical cycle.

 Other 
At the Palazzo Bocchi in Venice, an inscription on the facade quotes verse 2 in Hebrew.

 Musical settings 
Heinrich Schütz wrote a setting of a paraphrase of the psalm in German, "Ich ruf zu dir, mein Herr und Gott", SWV 125, for the Becker Psalter'', published first in 1628. Giacomo Giuseppe Saratelli set it is one of his 150 psalm settings in Latin, for choir, orchestra and basso continuo.

References

External links 

 
 
 in Hebrew and English - Mechon-mamre
 Text of Psalm 120 according to the 1928 Psalter
 A song of ascents. / The LORD answered me when I called in my distress:a text and footnotes, usccb.org United States Conference of Catholic Bishops
 Psalm 120:1 introduction and text, biblestudytools.com
 Psalm 120 – The Prayer and Journey of the Outsider enduringword.com
 Psalm 120 / Refrain: Deliver me, O Lord, from lying lips. Church of England
 Psalm 120 at biblegateway.com
 Hymns for Psalm 120 hymnary.org

120